The European Under-21 Baseball Championship is a bi-annual international baseball tournament sanctioned and created by the Confederation of European Baseball (CEB).

Results

Medal table

See also
 European Baseball Championship
 European Junior Baseball Championship
 European Youth Baseball Championship
 European Juveniles Baseball Championship

References

 
Under-21 sport
WBSC Europe competitions
European championships